Old Ministers' Hill Ward is a ward located under Nagaland's capital city, Kohima. The ward falls under the designated Ward No. 14 of the Kohima Municipal Council.

Education
Educational Institutions in Old Ministers' Hill Ward:
 Dainty Buds School
 Ministers' Hill Baptist Higher Secondary School
 RDNUMS School

See also
 Municipal Wards of Kohima

References

External links
 Map of Kohima Ward No. 14

Kohima
Wards of Kohima